Plak Raet is a sub-district in the Bang Rakam District of Phitsanulok Province, Thailand.

Geography
Plak Raet lies in the Yom Basin, which is part of the Chao Phraya Watershed.

Administration
The following is a list of the subdistrict's muban, which roughly correspond to the villages:

References

Tambon of Phitsanulok province
Populated places in Phitsanulok province